Maximilian Rosenfelder (born 10 February 2003) is a German professional footballer who plays as a centre-back for SC Freiburg II.

International career
Rosenfelder has represented Germany at youth international level.

Career statistics

Club

References

2003 births
Living people
German footballers
Association football central defenders
Germany youth international footballers
3. Liga players
SC Freiburg players
SC Freiburg II players